Old River Bed, Shrewsbury is a Site of Special Scientific Interest located two miles north of Shrewsbury town centre, to the east of the A528 in Shropshire, England. It is currently owned and managed by Shrewsbury Town Council.

The site is designated as a SSSI as it forms part of the former bed of the River Severn, which has been cut off from the main course of the river since the last glaciation. The Old River Bed is of particular value for the extensive sedge fen which now fills this cut-off meander of the River Severn. Although differing in its mode of origin, the Old River Bed is complementary to other wetland sites in North Shropshire.

Wetland plant species found at the Old River Bed include:
 Lesser pond-sedge - Carex acutiformis
 Common reed - Phragmites australis
 Great reedmace - Typha latifolia
 Water horsetail - Equisetum fluviatile
 Meadowsweet - Filipendula ulmaria
 Soft rush - Juncus effusus
 Sharp-flowered rush - J. acutiflorus
 Water avens - Geum rivale
 Bottle sedge - Carex rostrata
 Brown sedge - C. disticha
 Marsh cinquefoil - Potentilla palustris

References

External links 
 The Natural England SSSI Citation document

Sites of Special Scientific Interest in Shropshire